George Gilbert Hoskins (December 24, 1824 – June 12, 1893) was an American politician who served as the Lieutenant Governor of New York and United States Representative for the state of New York.

Early life
Hoskins was born in Bennington, Wyoming County, New York. Raised on a farm, he attended the common schools and an academy, and at the age of seventeen, he began teaching school. When he was twenty-two, he engaged successfully in mercantile pursuits.

Career
For a number of years he was town clerk of Bennington and justice of the peace, and was a member of the New York State Assembly (Wyoming Co.) in 1860, 1865 and 1866; Hoskins was Speaker in 1865.  He was Postmaster of Bennington, NY, from 1849 to 1853 and from 1861 to 1866. In 1867, he moved to Attica, New York, where he was commissioner of public accounts from 1868 to 1870. On May 1, 1871, he was appointed as Collector of Internal Revenue for the 29th District of New York.

A Republican, Hoskins served as United States Representative from March 4, 1873, to March 3, 1875, for the 30th District of New York; and from March 4, 1875, to March 3, 1877, for the 31st District of New York. He was Lieutenant Governor of New York from 1880 to 1882, elected at the New York state election, 1879.

Death
Hoskins died in Attica, New York, on June 12, 1893, at age 68. He is interred at the Forest Hill Cemetery in Attica, New York.

Family life
In 1846 Hoskins married Lois A. Hollenbeck.

References

External links

 Political Graveyard

1824 births
1893 deaths
Lieutenant Governors of New York (state)
Speakers of the New York State Assembly
New York (state) postmasters
Republican Party members of the United States House of Representatives from New York (state)
19th-century American politicians
Burials in New York (state)
City and town clerks
19th-century American educators
Schoolteachers from New York (state)
American justices of the peace
Republican Party members of the New York State Assembly